Hiyasmin Neri (born July 17, 1990) is a Filipino actress, host and musician.

Career
Hiyasmin Neri was introduced via Star Magic batch 15.  Her first regular TV appearance was in ABS-CBN's The Wedding, where she played a pregnant teenager and cousin to Anne Curtis's character Candice. Before signing up with Star Magic, Neri appeared in the indie films Xenoa and UPCAT.

In 2010, Hiyasmin was also part in a comedy educational sitcom, K High exclusively aired on Knowledge Channel Philippines, this was Hiyasmin's 1st educational show with also a bonus sitcom.

In 2013, Neri started appearing as one of the presenters of O Shopping, a Home TV Shopping program by ACJ, a joint venture between ABS-CBN Corporation and CJ Korea

The Pin-Ups
When The Pin-up Girls broke up in 2013, Neri was approached by the band's founder Mondo C. Castro to join The Pin-Ups. Neri sang and played the guitars for the short-lived indie band.

Personal life
Neri holds a Bachelor of Science in Clothing Technology degree from the University of the Philippines and completed her Masters in Business Administration  at Ateneo Graduate School of Business.

Filmography

Television

Film

References

External links

Living people
Star Magic
1988 births
People from Quezon City
Actresses from Metro Manila